Ashton Wheeler Clemmons (born September 2, 1983) is a Democratic member of the North Carolina House of Representatives. Clemmons has represented the 57th district (including constituents in north-central Guilford County) since 2019.

Education and career
Clemmons was born in Alamance County, North Carolina. She earned her bachelor's degree from the University of North Carolina at Chapel Hill, her master's in school leadership from Harvard University, and her doctorate of education from the University of North Carolina at Greensboro. She has worked as a school principal in Rockingham and Guilford counties and as assistant superintendent of the Thomasville City Schools. She lives in Greensboro, North Carolina.

Clemmons won the election on November 6, 2018 from the platform of Democratic Party. She secured sixty-eight percent of the vote while her closest rival Republican Troy Lawson secured thirty-three percent. She was re-elected in 2020.

Electoral history

2020

2018

Committee assignments

2021-2022 session
Commerce
Education - Community Colleges
Education - K-12
Finance
Marine Resources and Aqua Culture

2019-2020 session
Commerce
Education - K-12
Education - Universities
Finance

References

External links

Living people
1983 births
People from Alamance County, North Carolina
People from Greensboro, North Carolina
University of North Carolina at Chapel Hill alumni
University of North Carolina at Greensboro alumni
Harvard Graduate School of Education alumni
21st-century American politicians
21st-century American women politicians
Women state legislators in North Carolina
Democratic Party members of the North Carolina House of Representatives